Christian Sprenger (born 6 April 1983) is a German former handball player. Currently he is the assistant coach of THW Kiel.

He made his international debut on 4 January 2002 against Switzerland.

Achievements
Handball-Bundesliga:
Winner: 2010, 2012, 2013,2014,2015
DHB-Pokal:
Winner: 2011, 2012, 2013
IHF Super Globe:
Winner: 2011
EHF Champions League:
Winner: 2010, 2012
EHF Cup:
Winner: 2007

Individual awards
 All-Star Right Wing of the European Championship: 2012

References

External links

 Profile at THW Kiel official website

1983 births
Living people
People from Ludwigsfelde
People from Bezirk Potsdam
German male handball players
Sportspeople from Brandenburg